The 2017–18 Euro Hockey Tour was the 22nd season of Euro Hockey Tour. It started in November 2017 and lasted until April 2018. It consisted of Karjala Tournament, Channel One Cup, Carlson Hockey Games and Sweden Hockey Games.

Final standings

Karjala Tournament

The Karjala Cup was played between 8–12 November 2017. Most of the matches were played in Helsinki, Finland, two matches were held in Switzerland  and Sweden. The tournament was won by Finland.

Channel One Cup 

The 2017 Channel One Cup was played between 13 and 17 December 2017. The Czech Republic, Finland, Sweden and Russia with the new teams of Canada and South Korea were involved in the tournament. Eight matches were played in Moscow, Russia, one match was held in Prague, Czech Republic. The tournament was won by Russia.

Carlson Hockey Games

The 2018 Carlson Hockey Games were played from April 19th to April 22nd, 2018.

Sweden Hockey Games

The 2018 Sweden Hockey Games was played from April 26th to April 29th, 2018.

References

External links
 European Hockey Tour on Eurohockey.com

 
Euro Hockey Tour
2017–18 in European ice hockey